The ancient town of Baitudasht IV was located in the Pyange Region of Tajikistan.

World Heritage Status 
This site was added to the UNESCO World Heritage Tentative List on November 9, 1999 in the Cultural category.

Notes

References 
The Site of Ancient Town of Baitudasht IV - UNESCO World Heritage Centre Retrieved 2009-03-04.

Central Asia
Tajikistani culture